Workers Nationalist Youth (in Valencian: Joventut Nacionalista Obrera) was a left-wing nationalist youth movement in the Valencian Community, Spain. JNO was formed in 1921, and opted for the right of self-determination. JNO was short-lived, and was soon to be dissolved.

Political parties in the Valencian Community

Youth organizations established in 1921
Valencian nationalism
1921 establishments in Spain